is the Japanese name for the Eurasian tree sparrow. It may refer to:

 "Suzume" (song), a 1981 song by Japanese singer Keiko Masuda
 Suzume (film), a 2022 anime film written and directed by Makoto Shinkai
 Suzume (album), the soundtrack album to the film
 Suzume Odori, a Japanese folk dance